Horatio Seymour (1813 Middlebury, Addison County, Vermont – September 1872) was an American lawyer and politician from New York.

Life
He was the son of U.S. Senator Horatio Seymour (1778–1857) and Lucy (Case) Seymour. He graduated from Middlebury College, studied law in Syracuse, New York, was admitted to the bar, and commenced practice in Buffalo, New York in 1836. He married Elizabeth Staats (1816–1876), and they had two sons.

He was a member of the New York State Assembly (Erie Co., 2nd D.) in 1862 and 1863. He was the Democratic minority candidate for Speaker in 1862. He was Surrogate of Erie County from 1868 until his death.

Governor Horatio Seymour (1810–1886) and Congressman Origen S. Seymour (1804–1881) were his first cousins; State Senator Henry Seymour (1780–1837) was his uncle.

Sources
 The New York Civil List compiled by Franklin Benjamin Hough, Stephen C. Hutchins and Edgar Albert Werner (1867; pg. 442f)
 Biographical Sketches of the State Officers and Members of the Legislature of the State of New York in 1862 and '63 by William D. Murray (pg. 396f)
 The Seymour Family papers at the Litchfield Historical Society
 Manual for the Use of the Legislature (1868; pg. 226)

1813 births
1872 deaths
Politicians from Buffalo, New York
People from Middlebury, Vermont
New York (state) state court judges
Democratic Party members of the New York State Assembly
Middlebury College alumni
Lawyers from Buffalo, New York
19th-century American politicians
19th-century American judges
19th-century American lawyers